Rowland is a ghost town in northern Elko County, Nevada, United States.

Description
The site of the former community is located along the Bruneau River in Bruneau Canyon in what is now the Humboldt–Toiyabe National Forest.

History
Rowland was established in 1880s as a ranching community and never found quality ore. The community was named after Rowland Gill, a local rancher. A post office was established at Rowland in 1900.  There were services such as a store, and a saloon. The post office closed in November 1942 and was the end of the community. A number of buildings from the early years remain including Scott’s store and saloon and an old warehouse.

See also
 List of ghost towns in Nevada

References

External links

Ghost towns in Elko County, Nevada
Elko, Nevada micropolitan area
Ghost towns in Nevada
Humboldt–Toiyabe National Forest